The Provincial Teacher Training College, located in Siem Reap, Siem Reap Province, Cambodia, is a two-year college for students, who enter after they have completed either 9 or 12 years of school education. Graduates of the college teach in primary schools in Cambodia.

History 
The college opened on March 27, 1980, a little over one year after the end of Pol Pot's Khmer Rouge regime. After several relocations, it is now at a site previously used as Soryavaraman II Secondary High School between Siem Reap  and  Angkor Wat.

Curriculum 
The curriculum includes general knowledge, educational professional skills and ICT. Teaching practice involves students being placed in one of several primary schools in and around Siem Reap. First year students have 6 weeks of practice, second year students 8 weeks.

NGO Involvement 
The school received assistance between 2004 and 2008 from Belgian group VVOB for "strengthening the methodology of primary school teachers"; they remain involved in 2013.

See also 
 Public holidays in Cambodia

References

External links 
 PTTC Siem Reap website

Buildings and structures in Siem Reap
Education in Cambodia
Universities and colleges in Cambodia